Acadieman is the first Acadian superhero, created by cartoonist and musician Daniel "Dano" Leblanc. His animated series Acadieman, aired from 2005 to 2009 as a community channel production on Rogers TV, and was then acquired by TV5 Québec Canada for national distribution; however, TV5 cancelled the series in advance of its premiere.

Acadieman also exists in a comic book series, published by Éditions Court-Circuit, and in an animated feature film, Acadieman Vs. le CMA 2009.

Characters

Acadieman

The first Acadian superhero, he is the "official" pirate of the French language. He loves "the great indoors" and hates walking long distances. Coffee makes him strong, similar to the effect of spinach on Popeye. He likes hanging out in coffee shops and laughing at people while spoiling himself.

Other characters

A few characters appear regularly on the show:
 Ti-Gris
 Coquille
 Farty
 Johnny Dieppe
 Acadiemère

A few other characters have been only in a single or a few episodes. These include Anna (a satire of Anne of Green Gables) and a mutant potato (Jericot) who have appeared in the 4th episode "Le tourisme," in the first season.

Episodes

Season 1
 Acadieman vs. Memere Spy
 Acadieman vs. Sa Mere
 Acadieman vs. La Beach
 Acadieman vs. Le Tourisme
 Acadieman vs. The Living Dead
 Acadieman vs. Le Time Travel

(the episodes are all on the DVD of "Acadieman la complete first saison")

Season 2
 Acadieman Vs. Le Job Market  (aired May 26, 2007)
 Acadieman Vs. La War des Étoiles  (aired June 30, 2007)
 Acadieman Vs. Les Super Beavers (aired July 27, 2007)
 Acadieman Vs. Les Super Heroes
 Acadieman Vs. La Guerre Civile
 Acadieman Vs. True Acadienne stories

(Dano LeBlanc confirmed that the second season has six episodes)

Season 3
A full-length film entitled Acadieman vs. le CMA 2009 was released in 2009, with a plot that centred on Acadieman's efforts to save the Maritime Provinces from an invasion by the United States during the Acadian World Congress (Congrès mondial acadien). The film won the award for Best Acadian Feature at the 2009 Festival international du cinéma francophone en Acadie, and was released both as a full-length film on DVD and broken up into episodes broadcast as the third and final season of the regular series.

Special episodes
Acadieman Vs. Noël, a special Christmas episode, aired on CapAcadie.com in December, 2008. It was viewed by 10,000 people within 48 hours.

Ado Santé
Creator Dano Leblanc and his team put out fifteen (15) clips featuring Acadieman Vs. La Santé (Acadieman Vs. Health). These short videos feature Acadieman and friends in situations often faced by students during their day-to-day lives. Humorous and often less than two minutes long, the clips are also downloadable. They can be found on www.adosante.org and cover such topics as nutrition, body art, drugs and alcohol, mental health, relationship violence, physical activity and sexual health.

Since these videos are accessible throughout the globe via the Internet, all of the clips have two audio options: the legendary Chiac of Acadieman, and the other in standard French.

Awards
 2006 Impression Awards – Public Choice
 2006 Impression Awards – Diversity Programming
 Yorkton Short Film and Video Festival – Animation Category Nomination
 Yorkton Short Film and Video Festival – Jury's Choice Award

References

External links
  Acadieman

2000s Canadian adult animated television series
2005 Canadian television series debuts
Canadian adult animated superhero television series
Canadian community channel television shows
French-language television programming in Canada
Acadian culture
Rogers TV original programming